Luther Scott Harshbarger (born December 1, 1941) is an American attorney and Democratic politician. He served as the 56th Massachusetts Attorney General from 1991 to 1999. In 1998, he was the Democratic nominee for Governor of Massachusetts but lost a close race to acting Governor Paul Cellucci.

As of 2016, he served as senior counsel in the Boston law firm of Casner & Edwards, LLP.

Early life and education
Harshbarger was born in New Haven, Connecticut. He attended Harvard College, where he was a halfback on the varsity football team, and Harvard Law School.

Career 
After law school, Harshbarger worked as a public defender and civil rights attorney.

Middlesex District Attorney 
He was first elected as district attorney of Middlesex County, Massachusetts in 1982, defeating incumbent DA John Droney in the Democratic primary. He was re-elected in 1986.

Harshbarger was elected President of the Massachusetts Association of District Attorneys and was awarded the Livingston Hall Award by the American Bar Association for Harshbarger's outstanding work in Juvenile Justice.

Attorney general
In 1990, he was elected attorney general of Massachusetts, defeating incumbent James Shannon in the Democratic primary. He was re-elected in 1994 with 70 percent of the vote.
Harshbarger was one of the first attorneys general in the nation to sue the tobacco industry for manufacturing a product, cigarettes, which causes disease and death when used as designed by the industry. 
Harshbarger was elected president of the National Attorneys General Association.

Gubernatorial bid
He was the Democratic nominee for Governor of Massachusetts in the 1998 gubernatorial election. He lost in a close race to incumbent Republican Governor Cellucci. Afterwards, Harshbarger served as president of the public interest organization Common Cause for three years, where he supported efforts to pass the Bipartisan Campaign Reform Act.

Changing party
In June, 2016 Harshbarger announced that he would be leaving the Democratic Party to join the United Independent Party to assist them in reaching the voter enrollment necessary to remain a recognized party in Massachusetts. After a year, he returned to the Democratic Party.

Return to private legal practice
Since 2003, Harshbarger has practiced law in the private sector, focusing on corporate governance and related issues. He is currently Senior Counsel in the Boston law firm of Casner & Edwards, LLP. Prior to joining Casner & Edwards, Harshbarger was Senior Counsel at Proskauer Rose LLP in Boston, MA.
Harshbarger has continued to serve the Commonwealth of Massachusetts as a private practice attorney by accepting appointments by both Republican and Democratic Governors of MA . He has chaired the Probation Reform Commission and Correctional Reform Commission. He also serves as member of the MA Supreme Judicial Court Management Advisory Board.

Personal life 
Harshbarger is married to Judith Stephenson. They have five children.

References

External links

|-

|-

1941 births
District attorneys in Middlesex County, Massachusetts
Harvard Crimson football players
Harvard Law School alumni
Living people
Massachusetts Attorneys General
Massachusetts Democrats
Massachusetts Independents
Massachusetts lawyers
Politicians from Cambridge, Massachusetts
Lawyers from Cambridge, Massachusetts
Politicians from New Haven, Connecticut
Proskauer Rose people
Lawyers from New Haven, Connecticut
Harvard College alumni